A.C. Milan did not defend their European Cup title for a second consecutive time. The second place in Serie A was the fourth consecutive season when Milan finished inside the top three of the league. The loss in the European Cup quarter-finals rendered a first trophyless season since 1987, which resulted in Arrigo Sacchi leaving his job to take over the national team, being replaced by ex-Juventus and AC Milan midfielder Fabio Capello.

Squad

Transfers

Competitions

Serie A

League table

Results by round

Matches

Top scorers
  Marco van Basten 11
  Ruud Gullit 7
  Daniele Massaro 6
  Paolo Maldini 4
  Marco Simone 4

Coppa Italia 

Round of 16

Eightfinals

Quarterfinals

Semifinals

European Cup

First round
Milan were the defending champions and were given a bye to the second round due to both Liverpool F.C. (1985 Heysel disaster) and Ajax Amsterdam (1989 Iron rod incident) being banned in the tournament.

Eightfinals

Quarter-finals

Game abandoned in injury time when two of the four floodlights in the stadium failed. When power was restored after 15 minutes, Milan refused to go back on the pitch. UEFA awarded a 3–0 win to Marseille and banned Milan from the competition for the 1991–92 season.

Intercontinental Cup

European Super Cup

Statistics

Players statistics

References

Sources
  RSSSF - Italy 1990/91

A.C. Milan seasons
Milan